Singleton railway station served the village of Singleton in Lancashire, England.

History
The station was opened by the Preston and Wyre Joint Railway in 1870 and closed in 1932. It has been completely demolished since.

Incidents
A serious accident occurred at Singleton Bank, south of the station, in 1961, killing seven and injuring 116.

Route

References

Disused railway stations in the Borough of Fylde
Former Preston and Wyre Joint Railway stations
Railway stations in Great Britain opened in 1870
Railway stations in Great Britain closed in 1932